Sweden competed at the 2016 Winter Youth Olympics in Lillehammer, Norway from 12 to 21 February 2016. The Swedish Olympic Committee revealed the team at 18 January 2016.

Medalists

Medalists in mixed NOCs events

Alpine skiing

Boys

Girls

Mixed

Biathlon

Boys

Girls

Mixed

Cross-country skiing

Boys

Girls

Curling

Mixed team

Team: Johan Nygren (skip), Anton Degerfeldt, Tova Pettersson, Jenny Jonasson

Round Robin

Draw 1

Draw 2

Draw 3

Draw 4

Draw 5

Draw 6

Draw 7

Quarterfinals

Mixed doubles

Freestyle skiing

Ski cross

Slopestyle

Ice hockey

Girls' tournament

Roster

 Anna Amholt
 Josefin Bouveng
 Fanny Brolin
 Jennifer Carlsson
 Wilma Carlsson
 Julia Gustafsson
 Therese Järnkrok
 Lina Ljungblom
 Sofie Lundin
 Ronja Mogren
 Maja Nyhlén Persson
 Linnea Sjölund
 Madelene Strömgren
 Mina Waxin
 Madelen Westerlund
 Agnes Wilhelmsson
 Ethel Wilhelmsson

Semifinal

Gold medal game

Luge

Boys

Girls

Skeleton

Snowboarding

Snowboard and ski cross relay

Qualification legend: FA – Qualify to medal round; FB – Qualify to consolation round

Speed skating

Girls

Mixed

See also
Sweden at the 2016 Summer Olympics

References

2016 in Swedish sport
Nations at the 2016 Winter Youth Olympics
Sweden at the Youth Olympics